Frank Shaw may refer to:

 Frank H. Shaw (1882–1950), Pennsylvania civil engineer
 Frank L. Shaw (1887–1957), California politician and mayor of Los Angeles
 Frank Thomas Shaw (1841–1923), Congressman from Maryland
 Frank Shaw (writer), television and film writer, see Morning in the Streets and Frisco Kid
 Frank X. Shaw, American assistant film director
 Frank Shaw (producer), film producer, see Appointment for Love
 Frank Shaw (footballer) (1864–?), Scottish international footballer in the 1880s

See also
 Frank Shawe-Taylor (1869–1920), Irish land agent and High Sheriff of County Galway
 Francis Shaw (disambiguation)
 Frank Shore (1887–?), South African Olympic cyclist